Ted Edwards may refer to:

 Ted Edwards (footballer) (1883–1970), Australian rules footballer
 Ted Edwards (actor) (1884–1945), England-born American film actor